Gassoway is an unincorporated community in East Carroll Parish, Louisiana, United States located on U.S. Route 65.

References 

Unincorporated communities in Louisiana
Unincorporated communities in East Carroll Parish, Louisiana